Saint Helena, Ascension and Tristan da Cunha is a British Overseas Territory located in the South Atlantic and consisting of the island of Saint Helena, Ascension Island, and the archipelago of Tristan da Cunha (including Gough Island). Its name was Saint Helena and Dependencies until 1 September 2009, when a new constitution came into force giving the three islands equal status as three territories, with a grouping under the Crown.

History 

Of volcanic origin, the islands of Saint Helena, Ascension Island, and Tristan da Cunha were all formerly separate colonies of the English crown, though separately discovered by several Portuguese explorers between 1502 and 1504.

Portuguese discovery
The Portuguese found Saint Helena uninhabited, with an abundance of trees and fresh water. They imported livestock, fruit trees and vegetables, and built a chapel and one or two houses. Though they formed no permanent settlement, the island became crucially important for the collection of food and as a rendezvous point for homebound voyages from Asia. English privateer Francis Drake very probably located the island on the final lap of his circumnavigation of the world (1577–1580). Further visits by other English explorers followed, and, once St Helena's location was more widely known, English warships began to lie in wait in the area to attack Portuguese carracks on their way home from India. In developing their Far East trade, the Dutch also began to frequent the island and made a formal claim to it in 1633, but did not settle the isle and by 1651 largely abandoned it in favour of their colony at the Cape of Good Hope.

English colonisation

In 1657, the English East India Company was granted a charter to govern Saint Helena by Oliver Cromwell, and the following year the Company decided to fortify the island and colonise it with planters. The first governor, Captain John Dutton, arrived in 1659, and it is from this date that St Helena claims to be Britain's second oldest remaining colony, after Bermuda. A fort was completed and a number of houses were built. After the Restoration of the British monarchy in 1660, the East India Company received a Royal Charter giving it the sole right to fortify and colonise the island. The fort was renamed James Fort and the town Jamestown, in honour of the Duke of York and heir apparent, later King James II of England and VII of Scotland.

The Kingdom of England became part of the new Kingdom of Great Britain in 1707 and then the United Kingdom in 1801; the British Empire grew into a global great power.  The island of Saint Helena became internationally known as the British government's chosen place of exile of Napoleon Bonaparte, who was detained on the island from October 1815 until his death on 5 May 1821, and it was made a British crown colony in 1834 by the Government of India Act 1833. Unoccupied Ascension Island was garrisoned by the Royal Navy on 22 October 1815, shortly after which the end of the Age of Sail made its difficult location in the equatorial doldrums less important relative to its strategic importance as a centrally positioned naval coaling station. For similar reasons Tristan da Cunha was annexed as a dependency of the Cape Colony (British South Africa) on 14 August 1816, at the settlement of the Napoleonic Wars. For a short period just previously, Tristan da Cunha had been inhabited by a private American expedition who named the territory the Islands of Refreshment.

The political union between these colonies began to take shape on 12 September 1922, when by letters patent Ascension Island became a dependency of Saint Helena. Lightly populated Tristan da Cunha, even today little more than an outpost with a population of less than three hundred, followed suit on 12 January 1938. The three island groups shared this constitutional relationship until 1 September 2009, when the dependencies were raised to equal status with St. Helena and the territories changed its name from "Saint Helena and Dependencies" to "Saint Helena, Ascension and Tristan da Cunha".

World War II and subsequent military presence
During the Battle of the Atlantic of World War II and the following several years of U-boat warfare in the Atlantic, both Saint Helena and Ascension Island were used by the Allies to base patrolling anti-surface-commerce-raider and anti-submarine warfare (ASW) forces against the Axis powers' naval units. Initially long range naval patrol flying boats were used in the effort, and later in the war during the struggle to improve air coverage over the commercially important sea lanes, air strips were built to support land based aircraft which supplied, augmented and complemented the PBY Catalina patrol planes in the vitally important ASW mission.

The United Kingdom and the United States still jointly operate the airfield (RAF Ascension Island) on Ascension, which also serves as a space-based communications, signals intelligence, and navigation nexus and hub (Ground station). One of only four GPS satellite ground antennas is located there.

Geography 

Between Saint Helena and Tristan da Cunha is the Tropic of Capricorn. The three territories lie in the Western Hemisphere and have the same time zone: Greenwich Mean Time. Daylight saving time is not observed.

Although all three territories were formed by volcanic activity, only the Tristan da Cunha group of islands are volcanically active at the moment.

The highest point of the territories is Queen Mary's Peak on the island of Tristan da Cunha, with an elevation of 2,062 metres (6,765 ft) above sea level. The mountain is listed as an ultra prominent peak.

Climate
Because of the massive distance from north to south (over ), the territories have various climates. Ascension has a warm, arid climate, with temperatures all year long reaching above . St Helena is more moderate (and arid near the coasts). Tristan da Cunha, being closer to the Antarctic Circle, is much cooler and a lot wetter. The uninhabited southernmost Gough Island is wetter and has freezing winter temperatures.

Territorial waters

The Exclusive Economic Zones (EEZs) extend  from the islands' baselines. Despite their size, the three EEZs do not overlap or touch one another, nor do they reach the EEZs of any other country or territory. The territories have the largest EEZ of any of the British overseas territories (indeed larger than the United Kingdom's) and if included in the ranking of countries by size of EEZ, the territories would be 21st, behind Portugal and ahead of the Philippines. Neither the islands nor their EEZs are the subject of any current international dispute.

An application was made in 2008 by the United Kingdom to the United Nations Commission on the Limits of the Continental Shelf to extend the limit of the continental shelf claim of Ascension Island beyond . The Commission recommended in 2010 that the limit not be extended beyond the standard limit, based on scientific surveys.

Administrative divisions 

Administratively, each territory of Saint Helena, Ascension and Tristan da Cunha is governed by a council. The Governor of the territory presides over the Saint Helena Legislative Council, and an Administrator on Ascension Island and an Administrator on Tristan da Cunha preside over these two areas' Island Councils. See Constitution section below.

The island of St Helena is then further divided into eight districts.

Constitution 

The Saint Helena, Ascension and Tristan da Cunha Constitution Order 2009 (an Order in Council of the Privy Council of the United Kingdom) enacted a new constitution for the territories, which came into effect on 1 September 2009. Although raising Ascension and Tristan da Cunha to equal status with Saint Helena, the constitution is divided into three chapters, one for each territory. Saint Helena has a Governor and a Legislative Council, whilst Tristan da Cunha and Ascension each have an Administrator and an Island Council. Notably the constitution includes (for each territory) the "fundamental rights and freedoms of individuals".

Saint Helena also has an Executive Council. The Governor of Saint Helena is the British monarch's representative. The three territories share the same Attorney General, and the same Supreme Court and Court of Appeal.

Police and defence 

The Royal Saint Helena Police Service is responsible for policing on the islands. Defence is the responsibility of the United Kingdom, though no military forces are stationed on either Saint Helena or Tristan da Cunha. The Royal Air Force maintains a staging base at Ascension Island as part of British military forces in the South Atlantic.

Education

Saint Helena has multiple schools, including Prince Andrew School. Ascension has Two Boats School. Tristan da Cunha also has its own school.

Religion 

Most residents of St. Helena belong to the Anglican Communion through the Anglican Church of Southern Africa and are members of the Diocese of St Helena, which has its own bishop and includes Ascension Island.

Roman Catholics are pastorally served by the Missio sui iuris of Saint Helena, Ascension and Tristan da Cunha, whose office of ecclesiastical superior is vested in the Apostolic Prefecture of the Falkland Islands.

Currency 

In 1821 a copper halfpenny was struck specifically for use in St. Helena, which subsequently intermingled with British coinage.

Saint Helena used sterling currency as in the United Kingdom until 1976 when it began to issue its own banknotes at par with sterling. In 1984, the territory also began to issue its own coinage for both St. Helena and Ascension Island, with the same sizes as the coinage of the United Kingdom. Also similar to British coinage, Queen Elizabeth II is found on the obverse but the reverse have quite different designs referring to the territory. Whereas the coins are struck with "Saint Helena • Ascension", the banknotes only say "Government of St. Helena". Commemorative coins are struck separately for the two entities, and say either just "St. Helena" or "Ascencion Island". The Saint Helena pound also circulates on Ascension Island, but not in the other territory, Tristan da Cunha, where UK currency circulates.

The Currency Commissioners, part of the Government of Saint Helena, issue the St Helena pound banknotes and coins. There is no central bank; the currency is pegged to the pound sterling which is controlled by the Bank of England in London. The Bank of Saint Helena is the territory's only bank. The bank sets its own deposit and lending rates and has branches in Jamestown on Saint Helena and Georgetown on Ascension Island. Although the bank does not have a physical presence on Tristan da Cunha, the residents of Tristan are entitled to use its services.

Communications

Telecommunications
Sure South Atlantic provide the telecommunications service in the territories. Saint Helena has the international calling code +290 which, since 2006, Tristan da Cunha shares. Telephone numbers are four digits long. Numbers start with 1–9, with 8xxx being reserved for Tristan da Cunha numbers and 2xxx for Jamestown. Ascension Island has the calling code +247 and also has four-digit numbers on the island. Ascension Island also held an extensive broadcast facility for international shortwave transmissions to Africa and South America.

Mail
Ascension Island, Tristan da Cunha and Saint Helena all issue their own postage stamps, which provide a significant income. The three territories each have their own Royal Mail postal code: 
 Ascension Island: ASCN 1ZZ
 Saint Helena: STHL 1ZZ
 Tristan da Cunha: TDCU 1ZZ

Flags
The Flag of the United Kingdom is used for all official purposes; and each of the three territories has its own flag for official use. Between 2002 and 2013 Saint Helena and Tristan da Cunha each had their own separate flags, whilst Ascension Island used the Union Flag, and before 2002 the flag of Saint Helena was used in Tristan da Cunha for all official purposes.

Saint Helena

The flag of Saint Helena was adopted on 4 October 1984. It is a defaced (i.e. differentiated) Blue Ensign, i.e. a blue field with the Union Jack in the upper hoist-side quadrant and the shield from the coat of arms of Saint Helena centred on the outer half of the flag. The shield features a rocky coastline and a three-masted sailing ship, with a Saint Helena plover, also known as a wirebird, atop. It was updated in 2018 to depict a more realistic looking wirebird.

Ascension Island

The flag of Ascension Island was adopted on 11 May 2013. The flag is a blue ensign design, defaced with the coat of arms of Ascension Island. Prior to the adoption of this flag, the island used the Union Flag of the United Kingdom for official purposes.

Tristan da Cunha

The flag of Tristan da Cunha was adopted on 20 October 2002, in a proclamation made by the Governor of Saint Helena under a Royal Warrant granted by Queen Elizabeth II. Prior to this, as a dependency of Saint Helena, Tristan da Cunha used the flag of Saint Helena for official purposes.

The flag is a blue ensign design, defaced with the coat of arms of Tristan da Cunha – a Tristan longboat above a Naval Crown, with a central shield decorated with four yellow-nosed albatrosses and flanked by two Tristan rock lobsters. Below this is a scroll with the territory's motto, Our faith is our strength.

Transport

Maritime transport
Each of the three main islands has a harbour or small port, situated in the islands' chief settlement (Georgetown, Jamestown, and Edinburgh). In addition St. Helena has a 118 m long permanent wharf facility, built as part of the airport project, in Rupert's Bay for bulk, containerised and general cargos as well as passenger landings.

Airports

St. Helena Airport received its first scheduled commercial flight on 14 October 2017. Commercial flights, operated by Airlink using an Embraer E190, are scheduled from OR Tambo Airport in Johannesburg each Saturday, returning the same day (or Sunday when the extension to Ascension Island is operating).

Commercial flights between St. Helena and Ascension Island operate on the second Saturday of each month, with the aircraft returning to St. Helena on the Sunday, before continuing on to Johannesburg.

There is a military airfield on Ascension Island (RAF Ascension Island), though potholes on the runway resulted in the April 2017 cancellation of all but essential personnel/supply flights as well as emergency medical evacuations. Regular RAF flights connected Ascension with RAF Brize Norton in the UK and RAF Mount Pleasant in the Falkland Islands, a transport link called the South Atlantic Air Bridge. The flights are mainly to transport military personnel, though the RAF did allow fare-paying civilians to use them. Ascension Island is also used by the US military (which supply the base using MV Ascension) and was a designated emergency landing site for the Space Shuttle program.

The islands of Tristan da Cunha can only be accessed by sea due to the lack of an airport.

Vehicular traffic
Saint Helena has — paved and  unpaved—of roads. Each island has its own vehicle registration plate system. Traffic drives on the left in all three territories, as in the United Kingdom. Two of the nearest countries to the islands—South Africa and Namibia—also drive on the left.

See also 
ISO 3166-2:SH

Bibliography of Saint Helena, Ascension and Tristan da Cunha
British Overseas Territories
List of towns in Saint Helena, Ascension and Tristan da Cunha
Public holidays in Saint Helena, Ascension and Tristan da Cunha

References

Further reading

 Barrow, K. M. – Three Years in Tristan da Cunha. 
 Booy, D. M. – Rock of Exile: A Narrative of Tristan da Cunha. 
 Brander, J. – Tristan da Cunha, 1506-1902. 
 Brinck, Per – Coleoptera of Tristan da Cunha. 
 Chaplin, Arnold – Thomas Short (Principal Medical Officer of St. Helena). With Biographies of Some Other Medical Men Associated with the Case of Napoleon From 1815-1821. 
 Christopherson, Erling – Tristan da Cunha, the Lonely Isle.
 Christopherson, Erling and R. L. Benham – Tristan da Cunha, the Lonely Isle. 
 Crawford, Allan – Tristan da Cunha and the 'Roaring Forties'. 
 Gane, Douglas M. – Tristan da Cunha: An Empire Outpost and Its Keepers. (complete transcription online)
 Gill, Mrs. – Six Months in Ascension 1, Vol., 12 mo
 Gosse, Philip – Helena, 1502-1938. 
 Hall, Basil, Captain – Voyage to the Eastern Seas in the Year 1816; Including an Account of Captain Maxwell’s Attack on the Batteries at Canton; And Notes of an Interview with Bonaparte at St. Helena, in August 1817. 
 Kemble, James – St. Helena During Napoleon’s Exile: Gorrequer’s Diary. 
 Kiser, C. V. – A Study of St.-Helena Islanders in Harlem and Other Urban Centers. 
 Mackay, Margaret – Angry Island: The Story of Tristan da Cunha, 1506-1963.  (complete transcription online)
 Martineau, Gilbert and Frances Partridge – Napoleon’s St. Helena. 
 Masson, Frederic and Louis B. Frewer – Napoleon at St. Helena, 1815-1821. 
 Munch, Peter A. – Crisis in Utopia: The Ordeal of Tristan da Cunha. 
 Munch, Peter A. – Sociology of Tristan da Cunha: Results of the Norwegian Scientific Expedition to Tristan da Cunha, 1937-8, No. 13. 
 Munch, Peter A. – The Song Tradition of Tristan da Cunha. 
 Rowlands, Beau W., Trevor Trueman, Storrs L. Olson, M. Neil McCulloch, and Richard K. Brooke – The Birds of St. Helena. 
 Shine, Ian and Reynold Gold – Serendipity in St. Helena: A Genetical and Medical Study of an Isolated Community. 
 Stewart, C. S. – A Visit to the South Seas in the United States' Ship Vincennes, during the Years 1829 and 1830, with Scenes in Brazil, Peru, Manila, the Cape of Good Hope, and St. Helena. 
 Stonehouse, Bernard – Wideawake Island: The Story of the B. O. U. Centenary Expedition to Ascension. 
 Wace, N. M. and M. W. Holdgate – The Vegetation of Tristan da Cunha. 
 Weider, Ben and Sten Forschufvud – Assassination at St. Helena Revisited. 
 Zettersten, Arne – The English of Tristan da Cunha.

External links 

 government Website of Saint Helena
 Government Website of Ascension Island
 official Tristan da Cunha Website
 St Helena Online (UK-based news website, in partnership with the St Helena Independent)
 Tristan da Cunha on Thayer's Gazetteer
 Saint Helena, Ascension and Tristan da Cunha. The World Factbook. Central Intelligence Agency.

 
.Saint Helena
Islands of the South Atlantic Ocean
Island countries
West Africa
West African countries
Dependent territories in Africa
States and territories established in 2009
2009 establishments in Africa
2009 establishments in the United Kingdom
English-speaking countries and territories